3.1415 is the debut studio album from Taiwanese Mandopop artist Selina Jen of girl group S.H.E. It was released on 9 January 2015 by HIM International Music.

The tracks "3.1415..." , "Watch Me Now" (看我的) and "Love You For Who You Are" (一人水一項) are listed at number 23, 54 and 72 respectively on Hit FM's Annual Top 100 Singles Chart for 2015.

Track listing

Concerts

Music videos

References

Selina Jen albums
2015 debut albums
HIM International Music albums